Survivor: Überwinde. Überliste. Überlebe! (Survivor: Overcome. Outsmart. Survive!) is the first season of the German version of the reality television series Survivor. It was broadcast by the Prosieben network in 2007 and hosted by Sascha Kalupke. The prize for the winner was €250,000.

From its premiere, the show struggled to gain an audience comparable to the previous seasons. After the second week, the ratings dropped significantly and the show was relegated to an early morning timeslot. Volker Kreuzner, the oldest participant of the season, won by becoming sole survivor. Kreuzner wrote and published the book Crusoe 2.0 - Survivor Malaysia. Abgerechnet wird am Ende about his survivor adventures.

Format
A group of eighteen contestants were marooned on a desert island for 50 days and split into two tribes: Gunung and Tasik. For the first half of the game, the two tribes competed against each other in reward and immunity challenges. The tribe that won the reward challenge received a special treat that made their life on the island more comfortable. The tribe that won the immunity challenge was completely safe from any eliminations for three days.

Meanwhile, the tribe that lost the immunity challenge was forced to vote one of their own members off the island, eliminating them from the competition. Contestants were free to discuss how they wished to vote, and many alliances were made and broken as the series progressed.

After the first half of the game, the remaining members of the two tribes merged into a single tribe. They then competed in reward and immunity challenges on an individual basis. After the tribal merger, every contestant who was eliminated would join a jury that decided which of the two finalists won the €250,000 prize.

Contestants

Season summary

Voting history

Notes

References

External links
 Official Website (Archive)

Germany
2007 German television seasons